The "Clichy affair" refers to a French trial that took place in August 1891. The trial resulted from the shooting, arrest, and beating by police of three anarchists, at a confrontation in Clichy on May 1, 1891, which was the first French, and international, celebration of International Workers' Day. Two of the three anarchists arrested were convicted and given harsh sentences.

Event
About thirty demonstrators improvised a parade, with a red flag in front, from Levallois-Perret to Clichy. A little before three o'clock, after the flag was furled, and the demonstrators were dispersing, Police Commissioner Labussiere ordered the flag be confiscated. This is the incident which initiated the affair. Shots were exchanged and police officers were slightly injured. Three anarchists were immediately arrested, including Louis Leveille, himself wounded by a bullet. As soon as they arrived at the police station, they each suffered a violent beating. This caused a sensation among the anarchists. The three anarchists were charged with crimes for this incident. At their trial, on 28 August 1891, Advocate General Bulot demanded the death penalty against one of the defendants.

Affair
At first overshadowed by the  Fourmies Shooting, which happened the same day and killed nine demonstrators, the popular press had little interest in this trial. However it was followed with intense interest by anarchist newspapers. The anarchist newspaper, "La Révolte", highlighted the exemplary attitude of Henri Louis Decamps during his trial, as well as the violence suffered by his companions. Sébastien Faure published a booklet about this case, and the court proceedings, entitled The Anarchist in Assize Court.

Inspired
The acceptance of police brutality, by the prosecutors, and courts, and the convictions of the anarchists, were seen as a provocation by anarchists. With the help of some companions, Ravachol decided to respond. He perpetrated two attacks against the magistrates (judges) who heard the case.

References

History of Hauts-de-Seine
History of anarchism
1891 in France